Law is a surname, of English, Scottish, Cantonese, or Chinese origin. In Scotland, the surname means dweller at the low; as in a hill. Another origin of the surname is a contraction of Lawrence, or Lawson.

Notable people with the surname Law 
Notable people with the surname Law include:
Acie Law IV (born 1985), American basketball player
Alfred Law (1860–1939), English politician
Alfred Law (cricketer) (1862–1919), English cricketer
Alice Easton Law (1870–1942), New Zealand music teacher for the visually impaired
Alvin Law (born 1960), Canadian motivational speaker
Andrew Law (disambiguation), several people
Annie Law (died 1889), conchologist 
Benjamin Law (disambiguation), several people 
Bernard Francis Law (1931-2017), former Archbishop of Boston
Bonar Law (1858–1923), British prime minister
Brian Law (born 1970), Welsh footballer
Evander M. Law (1836–1920), general in the Confederate States Army
Denis Law (born 1940), Scottish footballer
Derek Law (born 1990), American baseball pitcher
Don Law (1902–1982), English-born country music record producer and executive
Edward Law, 1st Baron Ellenborough (1750-1818), English judge and politician.
John Law (disambiguation), several people
Josh Law (born 1989), English footballer
Jude Law (born 1972), English actor
Keith Law (born 1973), American writer. 
Mark Law (engineer), American engineer
Michelle Law, Australian writer and screenwriter
Nicky Law, several people
Peter Law (1948–2006), Welsh politician
Peter Law (actor) (born 1948), English actor and father of Jude Law
Phyllida Law (born 1932), Scottish actress
Rick Law (born 1969), American illustrator
Robert D. Law (1944–1969), United States Medal of Honor recipient
Robin Law (born 1944), British Africanist and historian 
Rudy Law (born 1956), American baseball player
Satya Churn Law (died 1984), Indian educationist
Sian Law (born 1981), wrestler from New Zealand
Thelma Patten Law (1900 - 1968), African American physician
Tony Law (born 1969), Canadian comedian
Ty Law (born 1974), American football cornerback
Vance Law (born 1956), American baseball player and coach
Vern Law (born 1930), American baseball pitcher
William Law (1686–1761), British theologian
William Law (Latter Day Saints) (1809–1892), early leader in the Latter Day Saint movement

Notable people with the surname Law (羅) 
Persons with the surname "Law"(羅) include:
Law Kar Po  (born 1947/1948), Chinese executive. Chairman of Park Hotel Group.

See also
Laws (surname)
Luo (surname), Chinese surname commonly transliterated as "Law"

References

English-language surnames
Hokkien-language surnames